Pach may refer to:

People
Joseph Pach (1928), Canadian violinist
Walter Pach (1883–1958), American artist, critic, lecturer, and art historian
Marek Pach (1954), Polish combined skier and ski jumper
János Pach (1954), Hungarian mathematician and computer scientist

Other uses
Chuathbaluk Airport, Chuathbaluk, Alaska, U.S.
Pach Brothers, a photography studio in New York City